Edwin Geovanny Castro (nacido en 24 Junio 1969) es un futbolista que jugó como delantero. Desempeñó la mayor parte de su carrera en Motagua marcando 40 goles. En 2023, decidió volver a los terrenos de juego y actualmente su club es el Tintoralba Higueruela, de España

Club career
Nicknamed El Venado (The Deer) because of his pace, the long-haired Castro also played for Súper Estrella, Marathón, Vida, Federal and Broncos for he scored 60 goals in total. He was the national league top goalscorer in 1995–96

International career
Castro played against Panama at the 1991 UNCAF Nations Cup.

Retirement
Castro was assistant to coach Hernaín Arzú at lower league club Venado-Barcelona. In 2010, he worked as a groundsman at the national stadium.

Personal life
He is married and has 6 children: Nicole, Charito, Melanie, Génesis, Kevin and Nahamán.

Honours

Motagua
Honduran National League: 1
 1992

Top goalscorers in Liga Nacional de Honduras: 1
 1996

References

External links
 La Tribuna - “Venado” Castro - La Tribuna 
 

1969 births
Living people
Association football forwards
Honduran footballers
Honduras international footballers
F.C. Motagua players
C.D. Marathón players
C.D.S. Vida players
Liga Nacional de Fútbol Profesional de Honduras players